The Steamie is a comedy-drama stage play, written by Tony Roper. It is set on Hogmanay 1950 and provides a window on the lives and aspirations of a group of Glasgow women washing their clothes in a public washhouse (steamie). It was commissioned by Borderline Theatre in the early 1980s and first staged by Wildcat at the Crawfurd Theatre, Glasgow in 1987.

A television version was made by Scottish Television for Hogmanay 1988. It gained immediate popularity, and has been repeated many times over the years. It starred Dorothy Paul, Eileen McCallum, Katy Murphy, Sheila Donald, Faye Milligan and Peter Mullan. Future EastEnders cast member Caroline Paterson also made an appearance. Haldane Duncan co-produced and directed it. A novelisation, also by Roper, was published in 2005.

The Steamie came second in an online poll for the television 'list' show STV's Top 30 Best Loved Shows, shown on Saturday 3 January 2009. The following day, a short documentary - The Steamie Story was broadcast on STV, marking the 21st anniversary of its first TV transmission. This was followed by the show itself. The Steamie is available to view in full on the STV Player in Scotland.

A 30th anniversary touring production with a cast comprising Libby McArthur, Mary McCusker, Steven McNicoll, Carmen Pieraccini and Fiona Wood was first performed at the Adam Smith Theatre, Kirkcaldy on 6 September 2017.

Critical reception
Of the stage version, The Scotsman opined, "The play has a kind of hilarious perfection"; while in the Daily Mail, Jack Tinker wrote, "The four Glaswegian biddies who rub, scrub and gossip their way...one Hogmanay eve back in the fifties create a clubbable camaraderie from their labours in a way entirely lacking today...Hearts are worn on rolled-up sleeves. It is impossible not to adore every rose-tinted minute."

References

External links
The Steamie on STV Player

1987 plays
British television films
British television plays
Culture in Glasgow
Hogmanay
Plays set in Scotland
Scottish plays
Scottish television films
Television shows produced by Scottish Television
Television shows set in Glasgow